Girish Bharadwaj  (May 2, 1950 in Karnataka) is an Indian social worker often referred to as Sethu Bandhu and Bridgeman of India for building around 127 bridges in remote villages across India. He was conferred the Padma Shri award in 2017.

Personal life 
Bharadwaj was born on 2 May 1950 and hails from Sullia in Karnataka. He graduated with a mechanical engineering degree in 1973 from P.E.S. College of Engineering in Mandya. He and his wife Usha have 3 children.

Career 
He built his first bridge in 1989 across the Payaswini river at Arambur in Southern Karnataka. Since then, he has built around thirty bridges in Kerala, two each in Andhra Pradesh and Odisha, while the rest of his works are in various parts of Karnataka.

References

Social workers
Recipients of the Padma Shri in social work
People from Dakshina Kannada district
Educators from Karnataka
20th-century Indian educational theorists
Indian mechanical engineers
Engineers from Karnataka
20th-century Indian engineers
21st-century Indian engineers
21st-century Indian educational theorists
Social workers from Karnataka
1950 births
Living people